Charles Cumberland  (1801 – 26 November 1882) was an Australian cricketer. He played two first-class cricket matches for Victoria.

See also
 List of Victoria first-class cricketers

References

1801 births
1882 deaths
Australian cricketers
Victoria cricketers
Place of birth missing
Melbourne Cricket Club cricketers